Mansor Al-Beshe (born 24 April 2000), is a Saudi Arabian professional footballer who plays as a midfielder for Saudi Professional League side Al-Raed.

Career
Al-Beshe started his career at the youth team of Al-Hilal and represented the club at every level. He was chosen in the Saudi program to develop football talents established by General Sports Authority in Saudi Arabia. On 21 January 2020, he signed his first professional contract with Al-Hilal. On 20 September 2020, Al-Beshe made his professional debut for Al-Hilal against Shahr Khodro in 2020 AFC Champions League. On 29 January 2021, Al-Beshe joined Al-Raed on loan. On 2 July 2021, Al-Beshe's loan to Al-Raed was renewed for another season. On 23 July 2022, Al-Beshe joined Al-Raed on a permanent deal following his release from Al-Hilal.

Career statistics

Club

Notes

Honours

International
Saudi Arabia U20
 AFC U-19 Championship: 2018

References

External links
 

2000 births
Living people
Sportspeople from Riyadh
Saudi Arabian footballers
Saudi Arabia youth international footballers
Association football midfielders
Al Hilal SFC players
Al-Raed FC players
Saudi Professional League players